Shiromaru Tyouseiti Dam is a gravity dam located in Tokyo prefecture in Japan. The dam is used for power production. The catchment area of the dam is 397 km2. The dam impounds about 9  ha of land when full and can store 893 thousand cubic meters of water. The construction of the dam was started on 1957 and completed in 1962.

References

Dams in Tokyo Prefecture
1962 establishments in Japan